The Saint-Chinian Formation is a geological formation composed of shales with limestone inclusions, dating from the Lower Ordovician (Tremadocian).

It is one of the six geological formations from the Saint-Chinian Cambro-Ordovician basin, comprising, from the most ancient to the most recent : La Dentelle Formation, Saint-Chinian Formation, La Maurerie Formation, Cluse de l'Orb Formation and Setso member, Foulon Formation and Landeyran Formation. This formation outcrops on the southern flanks of the Montagne Noire in Southern France.

The formation received its name from the small city of Saint-Chinian, a commune located in the Hérault department in Occitania.

It is dated from the biostratigraphic sub-zone characterized by Taihungshania miqueli and Asaphelina barroisi berardi.

Paleoenvironment

The thin nature of the silico-clastics deposits, the presence of slump, combined with a trilobite fauna dominated by members of the Asaphidae family indicates a marine environment of external distal platform.

Paleofauna

Shales of the Saint-Chinian Formation bears in certain areas accumulations of phosphated nodules, each potentially bearing a trilobite. Those are the so-called "schistes à gateaux"..

 Trilobites:
Members from the Asaphida order and the Asaphidae family are commons :
 Asaphelina barroisi barroisi,
 Asaphelina barroisi berardi,
 Niobella ligneresi,
 Paramegalaspis immarginata,
 Asaphellus frequens,
 Taihungshania miqueli,
 Ampyx priscus,
 Ampyxinella ;
The Agnostida order is present, with:
 Micragnostus calvus,
 Anglagnostus dux,
 Geragnostus mediterraneus,
 Arthrorhachis;
Ptychopariida order:
 Euloma filacovi,
 Solenopleuropsis ribeiro;
 Phacopida order :
 Platycalymene.

Other fossil remains of marine animals are known from the formation:
 brachiopods ;
 molluscs :
 bivalves,
 rostroconchs,
 monoplacophorans ;
 gastropods ;
 échinoderms ;
 graptolites.

References

Geologic formations of France
Ordovician System of Europe
Ordovician France
Ordovician south paleopolar deposits